Baron Ignaz von Plener (21 May 1810 – 17 February 1908) was an Austrian statesman. He served as Minister-President of Austria.

Biography
Baron (Freiherr) Ignaz von Plener was born in Vienna in 1810 in a family of lower nobility. He studied law at the University of Vienna before entering the governmental service.

In 1859 he was made Privy Councilor, a year afterward received the portfolio of Finance and revived the Bank Acts and the Ministry of Commerce before his resignation in 1865, and in 1867 entered the Liberal Centralist cabinet of Giska as Minister of Commerce. This post he held until 1870.

He became the 3rd Minister-President of Cisleithania from 15 January 1870 to 1 February 1870.

He was a member of the Lower House until 1873, when he was appointed to the House of Lords. In 1882 Plener was an ardent opponent of a personal income tax. He was the father of Ernst von Plener.

See also 
 List of Ministers-President of Austria

External links 
 Plener at aeiou

1810 births
1908 deaths
Politicians from Vienna
Barons of Austria
Constitutional Party (Austria) politicians
Ministers-President of Austria
Members of the Austrian House of Deputies (1861–1867)
Members of the Austrian House of Deputies (1867–1870)
Members of the Austrian House of Deputies (1870–1871)
Members of the Austrian House of Deputies (1871–1873)
Members of the Bohemian Diet
19th-century Ministers-President of Austria
University of Vienna alumni